Hazel Oyeze Onou, popularly known as Whitemoney, is a Nigerian singer, songwriter and reality TV star. He is the winner of Big Brother Naija season 6.

Early life 
Whitemoney is of Igbo descent from Enugu State, Nigeria, but he grew up in Kaduna State. Growing up, Whitemoney didn't go further than NECO level in his academic pursit.

Career 
Growing up in Kaduna State, Whitemoney left to Lagos in search for occupations. He ventured into different businesses such as commercial photography, barbering, repairing generators, and fixing telecommunication towers among others. He also invested in importing and selling shoes.

Musical career 
Whitemoney has produced a few songs including "Rosemary" (2018), "Your Life" (2018), and "My Heart" (2021).
On 3 December 2021 he released a single 'Selense' which was produced by Masterkraft, the song was released alongside its video.

Big Brother Naija 

Whitemoney entered the 6th season of Big Brother Naija as the fifth contestant on 24 July 2021.

During the season finale of the show on 3 October 2021, he was declared the winner scoring 47% of the final votes ahead of Liquorose with 22.99% of the total votes cast and was entitled to the ₦90 million grand prize.

Filmography

Television

References 

Living people
Big Brother (franchise) winners
People from Enugu State
Participants in Nigerian reality television series
Year of birth missing (living people)